The 2012 Asia Cup Final was the final of the 2012 Asia Cup, a One day International cricket tournament, and was played between Pakistan and Bangladesh on 22 March 2012 in Dhaka. Pakistan stunned Bangladesh in the last ball thriller to achieve their second Asia Cup title after 2000.

Background
The 2012 Asia Cup started on 11 March 2012 and was hosted by Bangladesh. All matches were played at Sher-e-Bangla National Cricket Stadium. Four full member national teams played each other in  Round-robin format. Pakistan reached the final by defeating Bangladesh and Sri Lanka while Bangladesh reached the final defeating India and Sri Lanka.

Road to Final

Match officials and result
 On-field umpires: Ian  Gould and  Steve Davis
 Third umpire: S. Ravi
 Reserve umpire: Masudur Rahman
 Match referee: David Boon
 Toss: Bangladesh won the toss and elected to field. 
 Man of the match: Shahid Afridi
 Result: Pakistan won by 2 runs

Scorecard

1st innings

Fall of wickets: 1-16 (Jamshed, 4.2 overs), 2-19 (Younis, 5.2 overs), 3-55 (Mishbah, 15.2 overs), 4-70 (Hafeez, 21.2 overs), 5-129 (Azam, 33.3 overs), 6-133 (Umar, 34.5 overs), 7-178 (Afridi, 41.3 overs), 8-199 (Gul, 44.3 overs), 9-206 (Ajmal 45.6 overs)

2nd innings

Fall of wickets: 1-68 (Nazimuddin, 16.4 overs), 2-68 (Jahurul, 17.5 overs), 3-81 (Tamim, 23.1 overs), 4-170 (Nasir, 42.3 overs), 5-179 (Shakib, 43.4 overs), 6-190 (Rahim, 45.1 overs), 7-218 (Mortaza, 47.4 overs), 8-233 (Razzak, 49.5)

References

External links
 Series home at ESPN Cricinfo

Asia Cup
Limited overs cricket matches
Asia Cup Final
Asia Cup Final
Asia Cup Final
Asia Cup Final
Cricket in Dhaka
Cricket in Sher-e-Bangla National Cricket Stadium